Lesley Leigh Bush (born September 17, 1947) is an American diver and Olympic champion. She represented the US at the 1964 Summer Olympics in Tokyo, where she received a gold medal in Platform Diving. Lesley performed with the 1968 Olympic diving team as well.

A resident of Princeton, New Jersey, Bush attended Princeton High School, which didn't have any diving facilities.

Bush was inducted into the International Swimming Hall of Fame in 1986. She received a Silver Anniversary Award from the National Collegiate Athletic Association as part of the Class of 1995.

Bush was married to Olympic swimmer Charles Hickcox, but is divorced. She is the sister of 1972 Olympic diver David Bush.  She was later married to fellow high school teacher, David Makepeace, while living in the Florida Keys during the 80's.  She was then teaching high school biology class at Coral Shores High School on Plantation Key.

Now retired, she was recently a science teacher at Thomas R. Grover Middle School in West Windsor, New Jersey.

See also
 List of members of the International Swimming Hall of Fame

References

External links
 

Kategori:Personer fra Orange

1947 births
Living people
American female divers
Divers at the 1964 Summer Olympics
Divers at the 1968 Summer Olympics
Olympic gold medalists for the United States in diving
People from Orange, New Jersey
People from Princeton, New Jersey
Princeton High School (New Jersey) alumni
Sportspeople from Mercer County, New Jersey
Medalists at the 1964 Summer Olympics
Pan American Games gold medalists for the United States
Pan American Games medalists in diving
Universiade medalists in diving
Divers at the 1967 Pan American Games
Universiade gold medalists for the United States
Medalists at the 1965 Summer Universiade
Medalists at the 1967 Summer Universiade
Medalists at the 1967 Pan American Games
21st-century American women